Mauritius competed at the 2016 Summer Olympics in Rio de Janeiro, Brazil, from 5 to 21 August 2016. This was the nation's ninth consecutive appearance at the Summer Olympics.

Mauritius Olympic Committee confirmed a team of 11 athletes, five men and six women, to compete in eight sports at the Games. The nation's roster in Rio de Janeiro was relatively larger than those sent to both Beijing 2008 and London 2012 by a single athlete. Among the sports represented by the athletes, Mauritius marked its Olympic comeback in badminton and weightlifting after an eight-year absence.

Three Mauritian athletes returned from the previous Games, including judoka Christianne Legentil (women's 52 kg), freestyle swimmer Heather Arseth, and triathlete Fabienne St. Louis, who was able to compete despite being diagnosed with salivary gland cancer eight months earlier. Meanwhile, Africa's top-ranked badminton player and 2010 Youth Olympian Kate Foo Kune was selected by the committee to carry the Mauritian flag at the opening ceremony.

For the second consecutive time, Mauritius left Rio de Janeiro without a single Olympic medal. Unable to reach the final, Legentil managed to reproduce her seventh-place feat from London 2012 as the most successful finish for the Mauritians at these Games, losing the match to Russia's Natalia Kuziutina in the repechage round.

Athletics (track and field)
 
Mauritian athletes have so far achieved qualifying standards in the following athletics events (up to a maximum of 3 athletes in each event):

Track & road events

Field events

Badminton

Mauritius has qualified one badminton player for the women's singles into the Olympic tournament. Kate Foo Kune picked up a continental berth as Africa's top shuttler based on her performance in the BWF World Rankings as of 5 May 2016, signifying the country's return to the sport after a 16-year hiatus.

Boxing

Mauritius has entered two boxers to compete in the following weight classes into the Olympic boxing tournament. Merven Clair and top seeded boxer Kennedy St-Pierre had claimed their Olympic spots at the 2016 African Qualification Tournament in Yaoundé, Cameroon.

Judo

Mauritius has qualified one judoka for the women's half-lightweight category (52 kg) at the Games. London 2012 quarterfinalist Christianne Legentil earned a continental quota spot from the African region as Mauritius' top-ranked judoka based on points in the IJF World Ranking List of May 30, 2016.

Swimming

Mauritius has received a Universality invitation from FINA to send two swimmers (one male and one female) to the Olympics.

Triathlon
 
Mauritius has entered one triathlete to compete at the Games. London 2012 Olympian Fabienne St Louis was selected as the highest-ranked triathlete from Africa in the women's event based on the ITU Points List.

Weightlifting

Mauritius has received an unused quota place from IWF to send a female weightlifter to the Olympics, signifying the nation's return to the sport after an eight-year hiatus.

References

External links
 
 

Nations at the 2016 Summer Olympics
2016
Olympics